Patricia Wright Ellis (born July 5, 1921) is an American former actress and dancer, weather presenter, announcer and commercial spokeswomen, who made several film and television appearances throughout the 1950s and 1960s, she also wrote, directed and produced, featured in printed adverts and created educational videos for which she won awards, including at the Argentine Film Festival

Ellis is most notable for her role as the leading lady in the short subject Cuckoo on a Choo Choo, opposite The Three Stooges and as an announcer on the late 1950s, daytime television series Queen for a Day

Biography

Early life
Wright grew up in Washington, and attended Washington State University, before moving to Hollywood to start an acting career in the 1940s, She worked as a secretary production assistant in radio and the assistant production assistant on The Bob Hope Show

Film and TV roles 

Wright was signe da contract with Paramount Pictures and her  film appearances include Chained for Life (1952), Trail Guide (1952), and Scandal Incorporated (1956). 

She appeared in several American television shows, featuring in such as Gomer Pyle, U.S.M.C., and The Adventures of Kit Carson and ''The Ray Milland Show 

In addition to her film and television roles, Wright worked for Fox News serving as Los Angeles' first ever television weathergirl. 

She also produced, wrote and directed educational multimedia for CBS

Personal life

Wright was injured in a car accident, which interrupted a few years of her early career in showbuisness

Wright in her post-acting career trained at UCLA and became a college Professor in Cal State Los Angeles. 

Currently retired, Wright was the guest of honor at the 2008 Three Stooges Fan Club Meeting. 

Wright suffered a stroke in recent years, she currently resides in Newport Beach, California and celebrated her 100th birthday on July 5 , 2021.

Filmography

References

External links

1921 births
Living people
Women centenarians
American centenarians
American film actresses
American television actresses
Place of birth missing (living people)
20th-century American actresses
Actresses from Spokane, Washington
21st-century American women